Hugo Dellien was the defending champion but chose not to defend his title.

Sebastián Báez won the title after defeating Marcelo Tomás Barrios Vera 6–3, 7–6(7–4) in the final.

Seeds

Draw

Finals

Top half

Bottom half

References

External links
Main draw
Qualifying draw

Challenger de Santiago - 1
2021 1